Hydriris bornealis is a moth in the family Crambidae. It is found in Borneo.

References

Moths described in 1875
Spilomelinae
Moths of Borneo